The Wolves Go Hunt Their Prey is the third studio album by German gothic metal band The Vision Bleak, released on 31 August 2007 through Prophecy Productions.

Track listing

Trivia
 Tracks 1 to 2 reference the famous case of the Indian feral girls Amala and Kamala.
 Tracks 4 to 6 form the "Black Pharaoh Trilogy", loosely based on H. P. Lovecraft's short story "The Haunter of the Dark".

Personnel

The Vision Bleak
 Ulf Theodor Schwadorf (Markus Stock) – vocals, guitars, bass, keyboards, sitar
 Allen B. Konstanz (Tobias Schönemann) – vocals, drums, keyboards

Miscellaneous staff
 Martin Koller – production

External links
 The Vision Bleak's official website

The Vision Bleak albums
2007 albums
Cthulhu Mythos music